A living room is a room in a residential house or apartment for relaxing and socializing.

Living Room may also refer to:

Arts and entertainment

Music 

 The Living Room EP, a 2003 EP by Seldon Plan
 Living Room (AJR album), 2015
 Living Room, a 2010 album by Ali Baba's Tahini
 Living Room, a 1984 album by Mark Murphy

Theatre 

 The Living Room (play), a 1953 play by Graham Greene
 Living Room (play), a 1943 work by Esther McCracken
 Living Room (2015 play), an Indian play written and directed by Kalki Koechlin

Other uses 

 The Living Room (TV series), an Australian lifestyle program
 Living Room (sculpture), an outdoor 2001 sculpture by Tamsie Ringler
 Living Room Games, an American company that produced role-playing games

Other uses 

The Living Room, a former New York music venue

See also

The Living Room Sessions (disambiguation), title of a number of albums
 Living Room Music, a 1940 composition by John Cage
 Living Room Suite, a 1978 album by Harry Chapin
 The Complete Living Room Tapes, a 2003 album by Lenny Breau and  Brad Terry
 Live in the Living Room, a 2008 album by John Craigie
 The Living Room Tour, a 2005 album by Carole King
 "Welcome to My Living Room", a ballad written and sung by Carole King
 "Living Room Song", a bonus track on the 2011 album Suburbia I've Given You All and Now I'm Nothing by The Wonder Years
 Family room, an informal, all-purpose room in a house